Charles Lockhart may refer to:

Charles B. Lockhart (1855–1948), politician in New Brunswick, Canada
Charles Lockhart of the Lockhart baronets
 Charles Lockhart (musician) (1745–1815), English organist and composer of hymn-tunes

See also
Charles Lockhart-Ross (disambiguation)